The 2008–09 season was FK Partizan's 3rd season in Serbian SuperLiga. This article shows player statistics and all matches (official and friendly) that the club played during the 2008–09 season.

Tournaments

Players

Squad information

Competitions

Serbian SuperLiga

Overview

League table

Matches

Serbian Cup

UEFA Champions League

Qualifying phase

UEFA Cup

First round

Group stage

Friendlies

External links
 Official website
 Partizanopedia 2008-2009  (in Serbian)

FK Partizan seasons
Partizan
Serbian football championship-winning seasons